WHCK may refer to:

 Windows Hardware Certification Kit, a test automation framework provided by Microsoft.
 WHCK-LP, a Religious formatted broadcast radio station which sign off in 2011.